Annamay Pierse (born December 5, 1983) is a former competitive swimmer who represented Canada in major international swimming championships including the Summer Olympics, FINA World Championships, Commonwealth Games and Pan Pacific Championships.

Pierse grew up in Edmonton, Alberta, and attended the University of British Columbia in Vancouver, British Columbia. She is the oldest of five sisters – all competitive swimmers – with one better and one younger brother.

Pierse was a breaststroke specialist and the holder of several Canadian records both long course and short course.  She was formerly the world record-holder in the 200-metre long course breaststroke until Rebecca Soni beat her time by 12 hundredths of a second during the 200-metre semifinals at the 2012 Summer Olympics.

On April 2, 2008 she placed first at the Canadian Olympic Trials in 100-metre breaststroke thereby qualifying her for the Beijing 2008 Summer Olympics. At the 2008 Summer Olympics in Beijing, she finished in sixth in the final of the 200-metre breaststroke. She was also a member of the Canadian team that finished seventh in the women's 4×100-metre medley relay.

She is married to Olympic paddler, Mark Oldershaw.

2008 Summer Olympics

Pierse represented Canada at the 2008 Summer Olympics and competed in the following events:

2009 Canadian Nationals
On March 14, 2009 at the University of Toronto pool, Pierse broke the world short course record in the 200 m breaststroke. Posting a time of 2:17.50. The Previous record was 2:17.75 belonging to Leisel Jones.

She was awarded a new Pontiac Car from a local dealer sponsoring the event who promised a new car to any athlete breaking a world record. A local Speedo dealer also awarded her $2,500 for the feat.

Thanks to this achievement, Pierse also won the Canadian Interuniversity Sport (CIS) female athlete of the year award for 2008-09.

2009 World Aquatics Championships
Pierse set a new world mark in the 200 m long course breaststroke at the 2009 World Aquatics Championships in Rome, with a time of 2:20.12 in the semi-finals. 1/10 of a second faster than the previous world record, Rebecca Soni set at the Beijing Olympics. However, in the finals, she faded down the final 50m and placed second (2:21.84) to the surprise victor Nadja Higl of Serbia.

2010 Pan Pacific Swimming Championships
Pierse brought home a Bronze medal in the 200m breaststroke from these Championships; Being behind Rebecca Soni, and Leisel Jones. Pierse said that this Pan Pac Bronze medal was more memorable than winning her World Championship medal. She had a rough year due to an illness and missed months of training.

See also
 World record progression 200 metres breaststroke
 World record progression 4 × 100 metres medley relay

References

External links
 https://web.archive.org/web/20110721225359/https://www.swimming.ca/liveresults/09springnationals/index.htm

1983 births
Living people
Canadian female breaststroke swimmers
Commonwealth Games bronze medallists for Canada
World record setters in swimming
Olympic swimmers of Canada
Swimmers from Edmonton
Swimmers from Toronto
Swimmers at the 2007 Pan American Games
Swimmers at the 2008 Summer Olympics
Swimmers at the 2010 Commonwealth Games
UBC Thunderbirds swimmers
World Aquatics Championships medalists in swimming
Commonwealth Games medallists in swimming
Pan American Games silver medalists for Canada
Pan American Games medalists in swimming
Universiade medalists in swimming
Universiade bronze medalists for Canada
Medalists at the 2007 Summer Universiade
Medalists at the 2007 Pan American Games
21st-century Canadian women
Medallists at the 2010 Commonwealth Games